Pushpa Devi Singh (born 18 May 1948) is an Indian politician who served on the 7th Lok Sabha for the Indian National Congress party.

Pushpa Devi Singh was born into a tribal family at Raipur, Chhattisgarh, the daughter of Raja Naresh Chandra Singh of Sarangarh, who had been Chief Minister of Madhya Pradesh. She was educated at St. Joseph's Convent, Sagar and Maharani Laxmibai College, Bhopal and Vikram University, Ujjain.

In 1980, Pushpa Singh polled 53.76 percent of the valid vote to win election to the Lok Sabha at age 31, making her one of that parliament's youngest members. Her nearest rival, Narhari Prasad Sai of Janata party, a minister in the Morarji cabinet, polled 21.97 percent of the vote.

In 1984 she was again elected for the Indian National Congress party, to the 8th Lok Sabha. Her 62.51 percent vote share at this election, beating Bharatiya Janata Party candidate Nand Kumar Sai with 29.98 percent of the vote, was an unbroken record in her constituency until 2004.

In 1989 General Election Pushpa Singh was defeated by Nand Kumar Sai, when there was a wave against Rajiv Gandhi's Congress. 
At elections to the 10th Lok Sabha in 1991 Singh won again, with 53.13 percent of the vote, again beating Nand Kumar Sai by then the President of the State BJP.  Her victories in these three elections are the only occasions when Congress polled more than 50% of the votes in her constituency. 

In 1996 Lok Sabha polls, Nand Kumar Sai beat Pushpa Singh. Out of the 4 contests between the two, Pushpa Singh won 2 (1984, 1991) and Nand Kumar Sai won (1989, 1996) twice.

She is an active member of the Indian Nationalist Congress Party and lives at Girivilas Palace in Sarangarh, Chhattisgarh.

References 

1948 births
Living people
Vikram University alumni
India MPs 1980–1984
India MPs 1984–1989
India MPs 1991–1996
People from Raigarh district
Women in Chhattisgarh politics
Lok Sabha members from Chhattisgarh
People from Ujjain
Indian National Congress politicians from Chhattisgarh
Nationalist Congress Party politicians from Chhattisgarh
20th-century Indian women politicians
20th-century Indian politicians
Women members of the Lok Sabha